2010 Isle of Man Parish Walk was held on 26–27 June 2010 starting at 08:00 hours at the National Sports Centre, King George V Park, Douglas, Isle of Man.  The race a racewalking event held under IAAF Category B Event rules follows an  traditional route visiting each of the islands 17 parish churches with a time-limit of 24 hours to complete the course.

The 2010 Parish Walk was won by Jock Waddington in 15 hours, 18 minutes and 6 seconds to complete a hat-trick of wins on the event.  The first female finisher was Susan Moore in 12th place in a time of 17 hours, 44 minutes and 13 seconds.  The total number of classified finishers for the 85-mile course was 133 walkers from a record total of 1,710 entries.

Results

PB – Personal Best / SB – Season Best / NR – National Record / DNF – Did Not Finish / DQ – Disqualified / DNS – Did Not Start

Sources

Parish Walk